The 1940 United States presidential election in Missouri took place on November 5, 1940, as part of the 1940 United States presidential election. Voters chose 15 representatives, or electors, to the Electoral College, who voted for president and vice president.

Missouri was won by incumbent President Franklin D. Roosevelt (D–New York), running with Secretary Henry A. Wallace, with 52.27 percent of the popular vote, against Wendell Willkie (R–New York), running with Minority Leader Charles L. McNary, with 47.50 percent of the popular vote.

Results

Results by county

See also
 United States presidential elections in Missouri

References

Missouri
1940
1940 Missouri elections